Peter Gentle (born ) is an Australian rugby league coach and former footballer who played in the 1980s. Gentle is currently the Assistant Coach at the St. George Illawarra Dragons.

Club career
A halfback and St. George junior, Gentle played three games of first grade for St. George Dragons over two seasons between 1987–1988, featuring mostly in the lower grades. Prior to that, he had played for Mansfield Marksman in the Rugby Football League in England during the 1986–87 season. He is the son of former Western Suburbs Magpies and Canterbury-Bankstown Bulldogs coach, Ken Gentle.

Coaching career
Gentle captain-coached the Camden Rams to consecutive Group 6 Rugby League first grade premierships in 1997 and 1998.
Gentle was employed as the head coach of Hull FC in the English Super League in 2012 and 2013. In Australia, he has worked as an assistant coach for various National Rugby League clubs, including Parramatta Eels, Wests Tigers, Cronulla-Sutherland Sharks, South Sydney Rabbitohs and Brisbane Broncos. In international rugby league, he has additionally worked as an assistant coach for both Australia and Italy.

Gentle was appointed as acting head coach of the Brisbane Broncos from 26 August 2020 following the resignation of Anthony Seibold. Following the conclusion of the 2020 NRL Season, Gentle departed the Brisbane Broncos. On September 28, 2020, it was announced that Gentle will be an Assistant Coach at the St. George Illawarra Dragons to Head Coach Anthony Griffin.

References

Sources

External links
Player statistics at rugbyleagueproject.org
Coach statistics at rugbyleagueproject.org
Profile at hullfc.com
Search for "Peter Gentle" AND "Rugby League" at BBC → Sport

1965 births
Living people
Australian rugby league coaches
Brisbane Broncos coaches
Hull F.C. coaches
Mansfield Marksman players
Place of birth missing (living people)
St. George Dragons players
Rugby league halfbacks